The Roman Catholic Archdiocese of Florianópolis is an archdiocese located in the city of Florianópolis in Brazil.

History
 March 19, 1908: Established as Diocese of Santa Caterina from the Diocese of Curitiba
 January 17, 1927: Promoted as Metropolitan Archdiocese of Florianópolis

Bishops

Ordinaries
 Bishops of Santa Caterina (Latin Rite) 
 João Batista Becker (1908.05.03 – 1912.08.01), appointed Archbishop of Porto Alegre, Rio Grande do Sul
 João Borges Quintão, C.M. (1913), did not take effect
 Joaquim Domingues de Oliveira (1914.04.02 – 1927.01.17)
 Archbishops of Florianópolis (Latin Rite)
 Joaquim Domingues de Oliveira (1927.01.17 – 1967.05.18)
 Alfonso Niehues (1967.05.18 – 1991.01.23)
 Eusébio Oscar Scheid, S.C.I. Dehonians (1991.01.23 – 2001.07.25), appointed Archbishop of São Sebastião do Rio de Janeiro (Cardinal in 2003) 
 Murilo Sebastião Ramos Krieger, S.C.J. (2002.02.20 – 2011.01.12), appointed Archbishop of São Salvador da Bahia
 Wilson Tadeu Jönck, S.C.I. (28 September 2011 - )

Coadjutor archbishops
Félix César da Cunha Vasconcellos, O.F.M. (1957-1965), did not succeed to see; appointed Archbishop of Ribeirão Preto, São Paulo
Alfonso Niehues (1965-1967)

Auxiliary bishops
Murilo Sebastião Ramos Krieger, S.C.I. (1985-1991), appointed Archbishop here
Vito Schlickmann (1995-2004)
Giuseppe (José) Negri, P.I.M.E. (2005-2009), appointed Bishop of Blumenau, Santa Catarina

Other priests of this diocese who became bishops
Jaime de Barros Câmara, appointed Bishop of Mossoró, Rio Grande do Norte in 1935; future Cardinal
Wilson Laus Schmidt, appointed Auxiliary Bishop of São Sebastião do Rio de Janeiro in 1957
Manoel João Francisco, appointed Bishop of Chapecó, Santa Catarina in 1998
Augustinho Petry, appointed Auxiliary Bishop of Brazil, Military in 2000
João Francisco Salm, appointed Bishop of Tubarão, Santa Catarina in 2012

Suffragan dioceses
 Diocese of Blumenau
 Diocese of Caçador
 Diocese of Chapecó
 Diocese of Criciúma
 Diocese of Joaçaba
 Diocese of Joinville
 Diocese of Lages
 Diocese of Rio do Sul
 Diocese of Tubarão

Sources
 GCatholic.org
 Catholic Hierarchy
 Archdiocese website (Portuguese)

Roman Catholic dioceses in Brazil
Roman Catholic ecclesiastical provinces in Brazil
 
Christian organizations established in 1908
Roman Catholic dioceses and prelatures established in the 20th century
1908 establishments in Brazil